The 1982 NBL season was the inaugural season of the National Basketball League. A total of eight teams contested the league in its first season, with Auckland claiming the league's first championship.

Final standings

Season awards
 Most Outstanding Guard: Brent Wright (Nelson)
 Most Outstanding Forward: Stan Hill (Auckland)
 Scoring Champion: Stan Hill (Auckland)
 Rebounding Champion: James Lofton (Porirua)
 All-Star Five:
 Brian Brumit (Waitemata)
 Stan Hill (Auckland)
 James Lofton (Porirua)
 Jack Maere (Auckland)
 Brent Wright (Nelson)

References

National Basketball League (New Zealand) seasons